Iconix can refer to:

ICONIX, an Agile software development process 
Iconix Brand Group, an apparel licensing company
Iconix Entertainment, a South Korean entertainment company